is a Japanese football player for SC Sagamihara.

Career statistics

Club
Updated to end of 2018 season.

1Includes Suruga Bank Championship.

Honours

Club
Kashima Antlers
J. League Cup (3) : 2011, 2012, 2015
Suruga Bank Championship (2) : 2012,  2013

References

External links

Profile at Kashima Antlers
Profile at Zweigen Kanazawa

1992 births
Living people
Association football people from Osaka Prefecture
People from Takatsuki, Osaka
Japanese footballers
J1 League players
J2 League players
J3 League players
Kashima Antlers players
Montedio Yamagata players
Zweigen Kanazawa players
SC Sagamihara players
Kansai University alumni
Association football midfielders